Numonyx was a semiconductor company making flash memories, which was founded on March 31, 2008, by Intel Corporation, STMicroelectronics and Francisco Partners. It was acquired by Micron Technology on February 9, 2010 for $1.27 billion USD.

Numonyx was created from the key assets of businesses that in 2006, generated approximately $3.6 billion in combined annual revenue. The company supplies non-volatile memory for a variety of consumer and industrial devices including cellular phones, MP3 players, digital cameras, computers and other high-tech equipment.

Officers 
Numonyx was managed by Brian Harrison, CEO of Numonyx and former vice president and general manager of Intel’s Flash Memory Group, Mario Licciardello, COO of Numonyx and former corporate vice president and general manager of STMicroelectronics’ Flash Memories Group. Edward Doller, former CTO of Intel's memory group, was their Chief Technology Officer.

Location 
Numonyx was headquartered in Rolle, Switzerland, and had sales, manufacturing and R&D facilities around the world.

References

External links 
 Main Corporate - former company website (redirects to Micron Technology, Inc.)
 Numonyx Acquisition Information - Micron Technology, Inc.

Defunct semiconductor companies
Electronics companies established in 2008
Rolle
Semiconductor companies of Switzerland
2010 mergers and acquisitions
Micron Technology